Dan Cruickshank's Marvels of the Modern Age is a BBC documentary series in which Dan Cruickshank traces the roots of Modernism and focuses on the movement's leading lights, such as Le Corbusier and Frank Lloyd Wright, and the century's most seismic political events including the rise of Nazi Germany.

The series was first broadcast on BBC Two between 9 and 30 May 2006 to coincides with the exhibition Modernism: Designing a New World at the Victoria and Albert Museum in London.

2006 British television series debuts
2006 British television series endings
2000s British documentary television series
BBC television documentaries about history
2000s British television miniseries
English-language television shows